Windows Mixed Reality is a platform introduced as part of the Windows 10 and 11 operating system, which provides augmented reality and virtual reality experiences with compatible head-mounted displays.

Its flagship device, Microsoft HoloLens, was announced at the "Windows 10: The Next Chapter" press event on January 21, 2015. The HoloLens provides an augmented reality experience where a live presentation of physical real-world elements is incorporated with that of virtual elements (referred to as "holograms" by Microsoft) such that they are perceived to exist together in a shared environment. A variant of Windows for augmented reality computers (which augment a real-world physical environment with virtual elements) Windows Mixed Reality features an augmented-reality operating environment in which any Universal Windows Platform app can run.

The platform is also used for virtual reality headsets designed for use on the Windows 10 Fall Creators Update, which are built to specifications implemented as part of Windows Mixed Reality, but lack support for augmented-reality experiences.

Products

Microsoft HoloLens

The premier device for Windows Mixed Reality, Microsoft HoloLens is a smart-glasses headset that is a cordless, self-contained Windows 10 computer running Windows 10 Holographic. It uses various sensors, a high-definition stereoscopic 3D optical head-mounted display, and spatial sound to allow for augmented reality applications, with a natural user interface that the user interacts with through gaze, voice, and hand gestures. Codenamed "Project Baraboo", HoloLens had been in development for five years before its announcement in 2015, but was conceived earlier as the original pitch made in late 2007 for what would become the Kinect technology platform.

Microsoft has targeted HoloLens for release "in the Windows 10 timeframe", with the Microsoft HoloLens Development Edition to begin shipping March 30, 2016, available by application to developers in the United States and Canada for a list price of US$3000. Although the Development Edition is considered to be consumer-ready hardware, as of February 2016 Microsoft has not set a time frame for consumer availability of HoloLens, with HoloLens chief inventor Alex Kipman stating that HoloLens will have a consumer release only when the market is ready for it. Companies such as Samsung Electronics and Asus had expressed interest in working with Microsoft to produce their own mixed-reality products based on HoloLens. Intel made a direct competitor called Project Alloy with its system called "Merged Reality"; however, it has been cancelled as of September 22, 2017.

Immersive headsets 
In October 2016 during a hardware event, Microsoft announced that multiple OEMs would release virtual reality headsets for the Windows Holographic platform, based on Microsoft reference designs enabling room-scale virtual reality without external sensors or components. In January 2017, prototypes were presented at Consumer Electronics Show for release later in the year, and Microsoft later announced that it planned to release development kits for such headsets during the Game Developers Conference. These devices would be supported by the Windows 10 "Creators Update". At the Game Developers Conference in 2017, Microsoft stated that it intended to support Windows Mixed Reality headsets on Xbox One in 2018, specifically noting the capabilities of the then-upcoming Xbox One X hardware revision, but the company later stated that it was initially focusing on PC platforms first, and that it wanted to focus on wireless VR solutions for consoles.

In October 2017, Microsoft officially launched Windows Mixed Reality and a lineup of third-party headsets for use with the Windows 10 "Fall Creators Update" (including a launch lineup of headsets from Acer, Dell, HP, and Lenovo, and future products from Asus and Samsung), officially referred to as Windows Mixed Reality immersive headsets. Unlike HoloLens, these devices are only compatible with virtual reality software, but the underlying ecosystem is referred to as Windows Mixed Reality regardless of experience. All Immersive headsets feature integrated motion tracking (eschewing standalone sensors), and contain cameras that can be used to track handheld motion controller accessories, which may be bundled with the headset, or distributed as optional accessories.

Immersive headsets are currently compatible with mixed reality software obtained from Microsoft Store, universal apps, and Steam VR-compatible software. The ability to run desktop software was added on the Windows 10 "May 2019 Update".

Microsoft classifies its minimum and recommended system requirements for Windows Mixed Reality as "Windows Mixed Reality PCs" (60 fps) and "Windows Mixed Reality Ultra PCs" (90 fps). The minimum requirements specify an Intel Core i5-7200U or better for laptops, 8 GB of RAM, Intel HD Graphics 620 or better with DirectX 12 support, USB 3.0, HDMI or DisplayPort connections, and Bluetooth 4.0 support for controllers; The Verge noted that users "won't need a high-end gaming PC" to meet these recommendations.

List of Windows Mixed Reality headsets 

* Note: Windows Mixed Reality headsets are also compatible with Xbox One Controllers.

** The Lenovo Explorer is also sold in some regions as the Medion Erazer X1000 MR Glasses.

Mixed Reality Portal 
Mixed Reality Portal is a Universal Windows Platform app that serves as a front-end for Windows Mixed Reality. It features a 3D environment which users can explore, and customize with application shortcuts and virtual desktops. The feature originally launched with one environment, the Cliff House. A second, Skyloft, was added in the April 2018 Update.

See also
 Comparison of virtual reality headsets
 Daqri
 Google Glass
 Magic Leap
 Meta (augmented reality company)
 Meta Quest 2
 HTC Vive

Notes

References

External links

 

Augmented reality
Mixed reality
Virtual reality
Windows 10
Mixed reality